Torn is a 2013 Nigerian psychological thriller film directed by Moses Inwang and starring Joseph Benjamin, Ireti Doyle and Monalisa Chinda. It received five nominations at the 2013 Best of Nollywood Awards for categories Director of the Year, Movie of the Year, Best Edited Movie, Best Screenplay, and Best Actress in a Leading Role, but did not win any awards.

Cast
Ireti Doyle as Ovu
Monalisa Chinda as Nana
Joseph Benjamin as Olumide
Bimbo Manuel as the psychotherapist
Femi Ogedengbe as Inspector
Tope Tedela
Julius Agwu

Reception
Nollywood Reinvented praised the film's storyline, calling it a departure from the usual form of storytelling used in Nollywood. It currently holds a 59% average rating.

See also
 List of Nigerian films of 2013

References

2013 films
English-language Nigerian films
2013 thriller drama films
Nigerian thriller drama films
2013 psychological thriller films
2013 drama films
2010s English-language films